Janet Lee Lam Lai-sim (born 1964) is the spouse of John Lee Ka-chiu who is serving as the 5th and current Chief Executive of Hong Kong since 1 July 2022.

Biography 
Lam married her husband in 1980 at the age of 16. They have two sons: Gilbert Lee Man-lung and Jacky Lee Man-chun.  Their son Jacky attended Wah Yan College. Lam is a singer who sings in a band with the wives of three former and current chiefs of the police services.

On 8 May 2022, her husband won the 2022 Hong Kong Chief Executive election, as the sole candidate approved by China. He took office on 1 July 2022, making Lam the spouse of the Chief Executive of Hong Kong.

In September 2022, she was introduced as the president of The Community Chest of Hong Kong.

References 

1964 births
Living people
Hong Kong women singers